Bire Wala Jattan (also spelled as Beere Wala Jattan or Birewala Jattan) is a village in Sardulgarh tehsil of Mansa district in Punjab, India. It falls under the development block of Jhunir and the district main city of Mansa is just 21 km away.

Geography 

Jherian Wali, Mian, Burj Bhalaike , Baje Wala and Raipur are the surrounding villages.

Demographics 
In 2001, as of census, the village had the total population of 1342 persons.

References 

Villages in Mansa district, India